Hanna is a town in southwestern McIntosh County, Oklahoma, United States. The population was 138 at the 2010 census, an increase of 3.8 percent from 133 in 2000. It was named for Hanna Bullett, the daughter of a prominent early resident.

Geography
Hanna is located at  (35.204186, -95.889423).

Climate

Demographics

As of the census of 2000, there were 133 people, 40 households, and 31 families residing in the town. There were 56 housing units at an average density of 492.8 per square mile (196.6/km2). The racial makeup of the town was 60.15% White, 33.08% Native American, 0.75% from other races, and 6.02% from two or more races. Hispanic or Latino of any race were 6.02% of the population.

There were 40 households, out of which 52.5% had children under the age of 18 living with them, 50.0% were married couples living together, 20.0% had a female householder with no husband present, and 22.5% were non-families. 22.5% of all households were made up of individuals, and 15.0% had someone living alone who was 65 years of age or older. The average household size was 3.33 and the average family size was 3.81.

In the town, the population was spread out, with 44.4% under the age of 18, 8.3% from 18 to 24, 25.6% from 25 to 44, 13.5% from 45 to 64, and 8.3% who were 65 years of age or older. The median age was 24 years. For every 100 females, there were 79.7 males. For every 100 females age 18 and over, there were 89.7 males.

The median income for a household in the town was $25,893, and the median income for a family was $26,607. Males had a median income of $18,542 versus $16,071 for females. The per capita income for the town was $5,845. There were 24.1% of families and 33.8% of the population living below the poverty line, including 40.5% of those under eighteen and 62.5% of those over 64.

References

External links
 Encyclopedia of Oklahoma History and Culture - Hanna

Towns in McIntosh County, Oklahoma
Towns in Oklahoma